Barry Vincent Ion (born 9 October 1941) is a former Australian rules footballer and radio personality. He played with Footscray in the Victorian Football League (VFL), Yarraville in the Victorian Football Association (VFA), and Woodville in the South Australian National Football League (SANFL). He became a well known radio personality in Adelaide and Sydney.

Ion started in radio early, commentating football matches for Melbourne radio in 1960, while also playing with the Carlton Rovers. He joined his elder brother, Graham Ion, at Footscray in 1961 and played with him in the 1961 VFL Grand Final, as a half back flanker. The grand final was just his sixth league game, having played just four home and away matches before the finals series. He made 29 appearances over the next two seasons, but then struggled with injuries, playing just five more games.

In 1966 he joined Yarraville in the Victorian Football Association; he wasn't able to play Saturday games as he was calling football for radio station 3KZ, but he still polled sufficient votes to finish third in the J. J. Liston Trophy for the year. He moved to Adelaide in 1967 and spent two seasons playing for Woodville.

While in Adelaide, Ion began working for 5AD and formed a radio breakfast duo with Tony Pilkington called "Bazz and Pilko". They were the highest-rated radio show in Australia during the 1970s and early 1980s, commanding nearly 40% of the radio market in Adelaide. Ion voiced a character called "Peter Plus". He joined 5KA in 1983, where he continued to work with Pilkington. In 1985 the duo brought their breakfast show to Sydney station 2UW where they remained until late 1991.

Discography

Studio albums

Compilation albums

Singles

References

1941 births
Australian rules footballers from Victoria (Australia)
Western Bulldogs players
Yarraville Football Club players
Woodville Football Club players
Australian radio personalities
Living people